White Southerners, from the Southern United States, are considered an ethnic group by some historians, sociologists and journalists, although this categorization has proven controversial, and other academics have argued that Southern identity does not meet the criteria for definition as an ethnicity.

Academic John Shelton Reed argues that "Southerners' differences from the American mainstream have been similar in kind, if not degree, to those of the immigrant ethnic groups". Reed states that Southerners, as other ethnic groups, are marked by differences from the national norm, noting that they tend to be poorer, less educated, more rural, and specialize in job occupation. He argues that they tended to differ in cultural and political terms, and that their accents serve as an ethnic marker. 

 "if you're not picturesque or grotesque or conspicuously rustic, people stop thinking of you as Southern." Upon white Southerners Jimmy Carter and Bill Clinton being elected to the U.S. presidency during the late 20th century, it was noted how little of the stereotyped image of the South they carried, along with helping symbolize generations of change from an Old South to New South society. Journalist Hodding Carter and State Department spokesperson during the Carter Administration stated: "The thing about the South is that it's finally multiple rather than singular in almost every respect." The transition from President Carter to President Clinton also mirrored the social and economic evolution of the South in the mid-to-late 20th century.

Some Southern writers in the lead up to the American Civil War (1861–1865) built on the idea of a Southern nation by claiming that secession was not based on slavery but rather on "two separate nations". These writers postulated that Southerners were descended from Norman cavaliers, Huguenots, Jacobites and other supposed "Mediterranean races" linked to the Romans, while Northerners were claimed to be descended from Anglo-Saxon serfs and other Germanic immigrants who had a supposed "hereditary hatred" against the Southerners. In the eleven states that seceded from the United States in 1860–61 to form the Confederacy, 31% of families held at least one African American in slavery. According to a 2014 study, about 10% of self-identified White Southerners have African ancestry, compared to 3.5% of White Americans in general.

Sociologist William L. Smith argues that "regional identity and ethnic identity are often intertwined in a variety of interesting ways such that some scholars have viewed white southerners as an ethnic group". In her book Southern Women, Caroline Matheny Dillman also documents a number of authors who posit that Southerners might constitute an ethnic group. She notes that the historian George Brown Tindall analyzed the persistence of the distinctiveness of Southern culture in The Ethnic Southerners (1976), "and referred to the South as a subculture, pointing out its ethnic and regional identity". The 1977 book The Ethnic Imperative, by Howard F. Stein and Robert F. Hill, "viewed Southerners as a special kind of white ethnicity". Dillman notes that these authors, and earlier work by John Shelton Reed, all refer to the earlier work of Lewis Killian, whose White Southerners, first published in 1970, introduced "the idea that Southerners can be viewed as an American ethnic group". Killian does however note, that: "Whatever claims to ethnicity or minority status ardent 'Southernists' may have advanced, white southerners are not counted as such in official enumerations". 

Precursors to Killian include sociologist Erdman Beynon, who in 1938 made the observation that "there appears to be an emergent group consciousness among the southern white laborers", and economist Stuart Jamieson, who argued four years later in 1942 that Oklahomans, Arkansans and Texans who were living in the valleys of California were starting to take on the "appearance of a distinct 'ethnic group'". Beynon saw this group consciousness as deriving partly from the tendency of northerners to consider them as a homogeneous group, and Jamieson saw it as a response to the label "Okie". More recently, historian Clyde N. Wilson has argued that "In the North and West, white Southerners were treated as and understood themselves to be a distinct ethnic group, referred to negatively as 'hillbillies' and 'Okies'".

The Harvard Encyclopedia of American Ethnic Groups, published in 1980, includes a chapter on Southerners authored by John Shelton Reed, alongside chapters by other contributors on Appalachians and Yankees. Writing in the journal Ethnic and Racial Studies, social anthropologist M. G. Smith argued that the entries do not satisfactorily indicate how these groups meet the criteria of ethnicity, and so justify inclusion in the encyclopedia. Historian David L. Carlton, argues that Killian, Reed and Tindall's "ethnic approach does provide a way to understand the South as part of a vast, patchwork America, the components of which have been loath to allow their particularities to be eaten away by the corrosions of a liberal-capitalist order", nonetheless notes problems with the approach. He argues that the South is home to two ethnic communities (white and black) as well as smaller, growing ethnic groups, not just one. He argues that: "Most important, though, and most troubling, is the peculiar relationship of white southerners to the nation's history." The view of the average white Southerner, Carlton argues, is that they are quintessential Americans, and their nationalism equates "America" with the South.

See also 

Mountain white
Poor White, a sociocultural group
Black Southerners
Redneck
Hillbilly
History of the Southern United States
White Americans in Texas
Jews in the Southern United States
Cajuns
Cracker (term)
French Louisianians

References

Further reading

Culture of the Southern United States
Cultural regions
Southern United States
White Americans